Dorothy Allison (born April 11, 1949) is an American writer from South Carolina whose writing focuses on class struggle, sexual abuse, child abuse, feminism and lesbianism. She is a self-identified lesbian femme. Allison has won a number of awards for her writing, including several Lambda Literary Awards. In 2014, Allison was elected to membership in the Fellowship of Southern Writers.

Biography

Early life
Dorothy E. Allison was born on April 11, 1949, in Greenville, South Carolina, to Ruth Gibson Allison, who was 15 years old at the time. Her father died when she was a baby. Her single mother was poor, working as a waitress and cook. Ruth eventually married, but when Dorothy was five, her stepfather began to abuse her sexually. This abuse lasted for seven years. At the age of 12, Allison told a relative about it, who told her mother. Ruth forced her husband to leave the girl alone, and the family remained together. The respite did not last long, as the stepfather resumed the sexual abuse, continuing for five years. Allison suffered mentally and physically, contracting gonorrhea that was not diagnosed and treated until she was in her 20s. The untreated disease left her unable to have children.

When aged about 11, Allison moved with her family to Central Florida. Allison found respite from her family life in school. She says she became aware of her lesbian sexuality during her early adolescence.

Education
Allison was the first of her family to graduate from high school.

In 1967, Allison attended Florida Presbyterian College (now Eckerd College) on a National Merit scholarship. While in college, she joined the women's movement by way of a feminist collective. She credits "militant feminists" for encouraging her decision to write. Also around this time, Allison severed all ties to her family until 1981. She graduated in 1971 with a Bachelor of Arts in anthropology.

Allison subsequently did graduate work in anthropology at Florida State University, The Sagaris Institute, and the New School for Social Research, where she earned a M.A. in urban anthropology in 1981.

Career
Allison held a wide variety of jobs before gaining any success as a writer. From 1973 to 1974, she was the editor of the feminist magazine Amazing Grace, in Tallahassee, Florida. During this time, she was also a founding manager of Herstore Feminist Bookstore in Tallahassee.

She worked as a salad girl, a maid, a nanny, and a substitute teacher. She also worked at a child-care center, answered phones at a rape crisis center, and clerked with the Social Security Administration. In certain periods, she trained during the day and at night sat in her motel room and wrote on yellow legal pads. She wrote about her life experiences, including the abuse by her stepfather, dealing with poverty, and her lust for women. This became the backbone of her future works.

Allison's first book of poetry, The Women Who Hate Me, was published with Long Haul Press in 1983. In 1988, her first short story collection, Trash, was published by Firebrand Books.

Her first novel Bastard Out of Carolina was published in 1992 to great acclaim, becoming a best-seller. It was later adapted as a film of the same name, directed by Anjelica Huston for TNT. The book and film both generated controversy because of the graphic content, and the TV film was aired on Showtime rather than TNT. The Canadian Maritime Film Classification Board initially banned distribution of the film in Canada, but it was reversed on appeal. In November 1997, the Maine Supreme Judicial Court affirmed a State Board of Education decision to ban the book in public high schools because of its graphic content.

Allison would go on to publish another novel and two collections of poetry and short stories.

In 1998, Allison founded The Independent Spirit Award to support writers who help sustain small presses and independent bookstores.

In 2006, Allison was the writer in residence at Columbia College in Chicago.

During spring 2007, Allison was Emory University Center for Humanistic Inquiry’s Distinguished Visiting Professor.

In the summer of 2007, she was Famosa in residence at Macondo in San Antonio, Texas.

In 2007, Allison announced that she was working on a new novel entitled She Who, to be published by Riverhead Books.

Allison held a three-month residency at Emory University in Atlanta in 2008 as the Bill and Carol Fox Center Distinguished Visiting Professor.

In fall 2009, Allison was The McGee Professor and writer in residence at Davidson College, in North Carolina.

Personal life 
Allison now lives in Northern California, calling herself a "happily born-again Californian". She lives with her partner of more than 18 years, Alix Layman, and son, Wolf Michael.

Writing 
Themes in Allison's work include class struggle, child and sexual abuse, women, lesbianism, feminism, and family. French literary scholar Mélanie Grué, describes Allison's work as a celebration of "the vilified transgressive lesbian body." Grué also notes Allison's ability "to make [lesbian] desire and pleasure public" in her writing, in contrast to the second-wave feminist views on "correct expressions" of sexuality.

Allison's first novel, the semi-autobiographical Bastard Out of Carolina (1992), was one of five finalists for the 1992 National Book Award.

Her influences include Flannery O’Connor, James Baldwin, Jewelle Gomez, Toni Morrison, Bertha Harris, and Audre Lorde. Allison says The Bluest Eye by Morrison helped her to write about incest. In the early 1980s, Allison met Lorde at a poetry reading. After reading what would eventually become her short-story "River of Names," Lorde approached her and told her that she simply must write.

Sex and gender activist 
Allison says that the early Feminist movement changed her life. "It was like opening your eyes under water. It hurt, but suddenly everything that had been dark and mysterious became visible and open to change." However, she admits, she would never have begun to publish her stories if she hadn't gotten over her prejudices, and started talking to her mother and sisters again.

Allison has advocated for safer sex and is active in feminist and lesbian communities. She and Jo Arnone cofounded the Lesbian Sex Mafia in 1981, the "oldest continuously running women’s BDSM support and education group in the country".

Honors and awards 
Bastard Out of Carolina was a finalist for the 1992 National Book Award in the fiction category.

Publishing Triangle named Bastard Out of Carolina one of "The Triangle’s 100 Best " novels of the 1990s.

In 2007, Allison was elected to the Fellowship of Southern Writers. The same year, she was awarded the Jim Duggins Outstanding Mid-Career Novelists' Prize at the Saints and Sinners Literary Festival, as well as the Robert Penn Warren Award for Fiction.

In 2018, Allison received the Trailblazer Award from the Golden Crown Literary Society for being, in the words of Karin Kallmaker, "the original firebrand. She didn't write for approval, she wrote to survive. She is a firebrand, truthteller, and trailblazer."

In 2019, the Alice B Readers Appreciation Committee of The Alice B Readers Award bestowed the coveted Alice B Medal and honorarium upon Allison.

Bibliography

Writing
 The Women Who Hate Me: Poems by Dorothy Allison (1983)
 Trash: Short Stories (1988) 
 The Women Who Hate Me: Poetry 1980–1990 (1991) 
 Bastard Out of Carolina (1992) 
 Skin: Talking About Sex, Class & Literature (1994) 
 Two or Three Things I Know for Sure (1995) 
 Cavedweller (1998) 
 She Who (TBA)
 Conversations with Dorothy Allison (2012)  
 Jason Who Will be Famous (2009)

Anthology contributions 

 Women on Women: An Anthology of American Lesbian Short Fiction, edited by Joan Nestle (1990) 
 High Risk: An Anthology of Forbidden Writings, edited by Amy Scholder and Ira Silverberg (1991) 
 Leatherfolk: Radical Sex, People, Politics and Practice, edited by Mark Thompson (1991) 
 Growing Up Gay/Growing Up Lesbian: A Literary Anthology, edited by Bennett L. Singer (1993) 
 Writing Women's Lives: An Anthology Of Autobiographical Narratives By Twentieth Century American Women Writers, edited by Susan Cahill (1994) 
 Downhome: An Anthology of Southern Women Writers, edited by Susie Mee (1995) 
 Swords of the Rainbow, edited by Eric Garber and Jewelle L. Gómez (1996) 
 The Best American Short Stories 2003, edited by Walter Mosley and Katrina Kenison (2003) 
 What Are You Looking At?: The First Fat Fiction Anthology, edited by Ira Sukrungruang and Donna Jarrell (2003) 
 Without a Net: The Female Experience of Growing Up Working Class, edited by Michelle Tea (2004) 
 Rhetorical Women: Roles and Representations, edited by Hildy Miller and Lillian Bridwell-Bowles (2005) 
 All Out of Faith: Southern Women on Spirituality, edited by Wendy Reed (2006) 
 New Stories from the South 2010: The Year's Best (2010) 
 Gay City: Volume 5: Ghosts in Gaslight, Monsters in Steam, edited by Vincent Kovar and Evan J. Peterson (2013) 
 The Queer South: LGBTQ Writers on the American South, edited by Douglas Ray (2014) 
 Crooked Letter i: Coming Out in the South, edited by Connie Griffin (2015)
 Walk Till the Dogs Get Mean: Meditations on the Forbidden from Contemporary Appalachia, edited by Adrian Blevins and Karen Salyer McElmurray (2015) 
 Badass Women Give the Best Advice: Everything You Need to Know About Love and Life (2018) 
 LGBTQ Fiction and Poetry from Appalachia, edited by Jeff Mann and Julia Watts (2019) 
 The Penguin Book of the Modern American Short Story, edited by John Freeman (2021)

Filmography
 Bastard Out of Carolina (1996)
 2 or 3 Things But Nothing for Sure (1997)
 After Stonewall (1999)
 Cavedweller (2004), directed by Lisa Cholodenko with Aidan Quinn and Kyra Sedgwick

Stage
 Cavedweller (2003), adapted for stage by Kate Moira Ryan at the New York Theatre Workshop

In popular culture
Her name appears in the lyrics of the Le Tigre song "Hot Topic."

References

Further reading

Contemporary Authors Online (Detroit, MI: Gale, 2004), 
Philip Gambone, Travels in a Gay Nation: Portraits of LGBTQ Americans (Madison, University of Wisconsin Press, 2010), 

 Carter, Natalie. "A Southern Expendable”: Cultural Patriarchy, Maternal Abandonment, and Narrativization in Dorothy Allison's Bastard Out of Carolina", Butler University Libraries, October 2013. 
 Johnson, Marrion. "Songs in Isolation: 17 LGBTQ Writers on What They are Listening to Right Now", Lambda Literary, April 19, 2020. 
 Wright, Amy. "Dorothy Allison: Tender to the Bone", Guernica Magazine, 2002. 
 Dorothy Allison's 
 Official Lesbian Sex Mafia Website
 
 AuthorViews video interview about Bastard Out of Carolina
 A Question of Class by Dorothy Allison
 Guide to the Dorothy Allison Papers at Duke University

1949 births
Living people
20th-century American novelists
21st-century American novelists
20th-century American poets
21st-century American poets
20th-century American women writers
21st-century American women writers
American women poets
American women novelists
American feminist writers
Lesbian feminists
Lesbian poets
Lesbian novelists
American lesbian writers
American LGBT novelists
American LGBT poets
BDSM activists
Sex-positive feminists
Writers of American Southern literature
LGBT people from California
LGBT people from South Carolina
Novelists from South Carolina
Writers from Greenville, South Carolina
Eckerd College alumni
Florida State University alumni
Lambda Literary Award for Lesbian Fiction winners
Stonewall Book Award winners
21st-century American LGBT people